Atrocity Exhibition may refer to:

 The Atrocity Exhibition, the book by English author J. G. Ballard, published in 1970
 The Atrocity Exhibition... Exhibit A, the eighth studio album by American metal band Exodus, released in 2007
 The Atrocity Exhibition (film), a 2000 American film based on Ballard's novel
 Atrocity Exhibition (album), the fourth studio album by American hip hop artist Danny Brown, released in 2016
 "Atrocity Exhibition"  (song), the opening song of English rock band Joy Division's second and final studio album Closer, released in 1980